Tiger Woods PGA Tour 2000 is a sports video game developed by EA Redwood Shores for the PlayStation version, Xantera for the Game Boy Color version and Rainbow Studios for the Microsoft Windows version and published by EA Sports for PlayStation in 1999 and Game Boy Color and Microsoft Windows in 2000.

Reception

The game received "mixed or average" reviews on all platforms according to video game review aggregator GameRankings.

PGA Tour 2000s computer version received a "Silver" sales award from the Entertainment and Leisure Software Publishers Association (ELSPA), indicating sales of at least 100,000 copies in the United Kingdom.

See also
CyberTiger

References

External links
 
 

1999 video games
EA Sports games
Game Boy Color games
Golf video games
Multiplayer and single-player video games
PlayStation (console) games
Rainbow Studios games
Tiger Woods video games
Video games developed in the United States
Windows games
Xantera games